The Parti canadien or Parti patriote was a primarily francophone political party in what is now Quebec founded by members of the liberal elite of Lower Canada at the beginning of the 19th century. Its members were made up of liberal professionals and small-scale merchants, including François Blanchet, Pierre-Stanislas Bédard, John Neilson, Jean-Thomas Taschereau, James Stuart, Louis Bourdages, Denis-Benjamin Viger, Daniel Tracey, Edmund Bailey O'Callaghan, Andrew Stuart and Louis-Joseph Papineau.

Creation 
The British Government established two oligarchic governments, or councils, to rule what is today Quebec and Ontario, then called Lower and Upper Canada. Upper Canada ruled by the Family Compact and Lower Canada ruled by the Chateau Clique. Both groups exerted monopolistic, uncontested rule over economic and political life. The councils were corrupt in their nature by strengthening their dominance by personal use of funds which eventually led to infrastructural problems around Upper and Lower Canada, including land distribution, poor road conditions, and lack of education funding.

Continuous frustration between the councils and the legislative assemblies over language differences and Lower Canada's discontent for treatment of French problems led to the beginning of the Parti Canadien.
English merchants and politicians in Canada pushed for an assemblage of the Canada's, which would lead to the assimilation of the French. Louis-Joseph Papineau rallied the people of Lower Canada to sign a petition against the proposition. Papineau later sailed to Britain to present the petition to the British Government and to rally for the rights of the people of Lower Canada, only to have the issue heard with little action to follow. Later, the British Parliament passed the Canada Land and Tenures Act which abolished the feudal and seigneurial systems in British North America. The act left property rights of many land owners in limbo and created much confusion and conflict in Lower Canada where the French Civil Code was in action, and thus infuriating the French people of Lower Canada even more. In July 1830, word of a liberal revolution in France sparked the youth of Lower Canada as liberalism was non-existent in Canada at the time. Upper and Lower Canada governments tried and failed to resolve the recent uprising and tension, even further-distancing the French people of Lower Canada from the English of Upper Canada.

History 
Under the leadership of Pierre-Stanislas Bédard, the party campaigned for ministerial responsibility and a responsible government in which the members of the Legislative Council of Lower Canada would be appointed by the Legislative Assembly's majority party. Although the party controlled the assembly in Lower Canada, at that time the council, which held most of the power, was chosen by an appointed British governor, whom the Parti canadien considered to be seriously corrupt and hostile to the interests of the majority of the population.

In 1806 the Parti canadien imitated its political adversaries, the Tory Château Clique, in founding a newspaper named Le Canadien. In 1810 Governor Craig had Bédard and some of his colleagues at the newspaper arrested and imprisoned without trial for a comment published in Le Canadien.

In 1811 James Stuart became leader of the Parti canadien in the assembly and, in 1815, reformer Louis-Joseph Papineau was elected Assembly Speaker. Papineau's reformist ideas gained in authority and popularity as he led the party in its fight against the union of the Canada's proposal in 1822, until the suspension of the Constitutional Act in 1837.

Parti Patriote 
In 1826 the party took the name of Parti Patriote, reflecting a much stronger sense of French-Canadian nationalism and a change of strategy. The Patriotes largely favoured agriculture over commercialism and blocked many economic projects led by their adversaries. The party succeeded in delaying development of British capitalism within the colony, however their positions were often seen as unclear, and the new strategy was considered too radical even by some of its members, most notably John Neilson, who eventually left the party in 1830.

In 1834 Papineau and the Parti Patriote created the Ninety-Two Resolutions; an extensive list of demands for political reform which was sent to the British government. The British government ignored the resolutions for over three years until in 1837 it countered the Parti Patriote's requests with ten resolutions of its own, called the Russel Resolutions, while rejecting all proposed ninety-two resolutions made by Papineau and his party. These resolutions allowed the colony governor to obtain budgetary estimates without vote of the assembly, which brought about verbal and physical violence, and eventually led to the Rebellions of 1837. After the rebellions, many patriotes were exiled, hanged, or had their houses set ablaze, which marked the end of the party. However many party members became active members in politics of the new Province of Canada.

Newspapers 
 Le Canadien (1806-1837)
 La Minerve (1826-1837)
 The Canadian Vindicator (1828-1837)
 Le Libéral  (1837)
 L'Écho du Pays (1834)

References 

 
 
 
 
 
The History of Canada OnLine. " Background of Discontent", in "History of Canada OnLine", 2012
Canadian Politics OnLine. " Quebec", in "Canadian Politics OnLine", 2012

See also 

Liberalism
Contributions to liberal theory
Liberalism worldwide
List of liberal parties
Liberal democracy
 Timeline of Quebec history
 Liberalism in Canada
 Lower Canada Rebellion
 List of Canadian political parties
 Parti rouge
 Bloc Québécois

Patriote movement
Political parties in Lower Canada
Canada 1800s